Joshua Buernortey Boye-Doe known popularly as KalyJay is a Ghanaian social media influencer and activist who has raised awareness about various issues in the Ghanaian community through his platform. He is known for his role in the #FixTheCountry social media campaign that later developed into a public protest against the Ghanaian government in the early part of 2021.

Early life and education 
KalyJay is an alumnus of the Ghana Institute of Journalism with a Bachelor Degree in Communication Studies specializing in Public Relations. Before then, he attended Christland International School and Okuapeman Senior High School for his junior and senior high level of education respectively. KalyJay attended Big Ada Methodist School and Dansoman Baptist Academy before his admission to Christland International School.

Career and advocacy 
KalyJay started out in 2019 as a social media influencer when his Twitter page begun to gain traction. He began performing influencer functions through promotion, and championing appeal for fund causes for the needy and sick. He has since through his platform garner ambassadorial deals and sponsorships from notable companies like Fan Milk, Nivea, Jumia, Bolt (company), United Bank for Africa, First Atlantic Bank, Huawei, Bet Planet, Betway and Ticketlake.

In May 2021, KalyJay through his platform with over 600,000 followers begun a social media campaign under the hashtag #FixTheCountry. The campaign sought for accountability and good governance from the Ghanaian government. The social media protest evolved later into a national protest that saw a large number of Ghanaians gather to protest on the streets of Accra in August, 2021.

In October 2021, KayJay partnered with Grammy board member Richardine Bartine to use his platform as a tool to feature and promote international artists. The platform has featured many top African stars such as Sarkodie (rapper), D-Black, Tiwa Savage, Darkovibes, Joeboy, Wendy Shay, and Mona 4reall among other acts, bringing their fans together through his Twitter Space.

Awards and honors 
 Won, Pulse Twitter Influencer of the Year 2021.
 Nominated, Brand Influencer of the Year, National Communication Awards 2021.
 Nominated, Online Media Personality of the Year, National Communication Awards 2021.
 Nominated, Advocate of Good Governance, GhanaWeb Excellence Awards 2021.
 Nominated, Social Media Personality of the Year. GhanaWeb Excellence Awards 2021.
 Nominated, Twitter Influencer Of The Year, Ghana Twitter Awards 2020.

References

External links 

Ghanaian activists
1997 births
Living people
Ghana Institute of Journalism alumni